The Alexander Crummell School is an Elizabethan Revival school building, located at 1900 Gallaudet Street and Kendall Street, Northeast, Washington, D.C., in the Ivy City neighborhood.

History
It was designed by Snowden Ashford in 1910, and named for educator and Episcopal priest the Rev. Alexander Crummell. 
It was built in 1911 by Allan T. Howlson, for $44,987.00.
It was dedicated on November 23, 1911. It was closed in 1977. A community group used the school for a preschool, library, job training and daycare center. During the 1990s, the property was used by an automobile auctioneer.

In 2012 the District government, under Mayor Grey, decided to relocate tour bus parking from Union Station to the Crummell School, paving the schoolyard, fencing-in the property, and adding pylons to protect the historic building from buses running into it. Empower DC sued the DC government, and won injunctions preventing the city from actually using the historic schoolyard, dedicated to the teaching of African Americans, as a parking lot. The city, blocked from using it as a tour bus parking lot, dropped the tour bus plan in 2016, instead putting an RFP out for private developers to bid on.

It was listed by the D.C. Historic Preservation Review Board, on May 23, 2002.  
It was listed on the National Register of Historic Places, in 2003. The DC Preservation League placed it on its endangered list.

In 2016 it was part of a redevelopment plan. As of November 2020, the building is still vacant.

See also
National Register of Historic Places listings in Washington, D.C.

References

External links
http://www.victoriansecrets.net/crummell.html
http://www.wdchumanities.org/bigreadexhibit/exhibits/show/dcsegregatedschools/ward-5
Cleanup and Beautification Project Planned for Crummell School Saturday, June 25, 2010
Alexander Crummell School (historical), DC

School buildings completed in 1911
School buildings on the National Register of Historic Places in Washington, D.C.
1911 establishments in Washington, D.C.